One Churchill Place is a 156 m tall skyscraper with 32 floors, serving as the headquarters of Barclays Bank. It is in the Docklands area of London Borough of Tower Hamlets in Canary Wharf. The building is the 13th-tallest office block in the United Kingdom and the sixth tallest building in the Docklands.

The building was formally opened in June 2005 by the Chairman of Barclays, Matthew Barrett, and merged Barclays offices across London into one building. The former corporate HQ was at 54 Lombard Street in the City of London.

Barclays occupy 100% of the building; floors 18-20 were previously leased to BGC Partners/Cantor Fitzgerald.  Several floors were previously occupied by the Olympic Delivery Teams prior to 2012, and a portion of level 17 was occupied by the Metropolitan Police.

Construction

The building was designed by HOK International and constructed by Canary Wharf Contractors.

Designed after the 9/11 terrorist attacks, the building is constructed around four staircase columns with a large, central column containing the lifts and toilet facilities. The building manual states that there is enough room in these columns to contain everyone who works in the building, in the event of a security alert.

The building was planned to be 50 storeys in height, but was scaled down to 31 after the 9/11 terrorist attacks.

It is linked by walkways to the Canada Square shopping mall and Canary Wharf Underground station.

See also

Tall buildings in London

References

External links

From emporis.com
Wildlife on top of One Churchill Place
Barclays Group Archives: Head Office

Skyscrapers in the London Borough of Tower Hamlets
Buildings and structures in the London Borough of Tower Hamlets
Barclays
Canary Wharf buildings
Commercial buildings completed in 2004
Skyscraper office buildings in London
HOK (firm) buildings